Muraena lentiginosa is a moray eel from the Eastern Pacific. It occasionally makes its way into the aquarium trade.

References

External links
 

lentiginosa
Fish described in 1842